The 1989 Berlin Marathon was the 16th running of the annual marathon race held in Berlin, West Germany, held on 1 October. Australia's Alfredo Shahanga won the men's race in 2:10:11 hours, while the women's race was won by Finland's Päivi Tikkanen in 2:28:45. Heinz Frei (1:40:11) and Daniela Jutzeler (1:55:23), both of Switzerland, won the men's and women's wheelchair races. A total of 13,433 runners finished the race, 12,233 men and 1200 women.

Results

Men

Women

References 

 Results. Association of Road Racing Statisticians. Retrieved 2020-05-30.

External links 
 Official website

1989
Berlin Marathon
1989 in Berlin
Berlin Marathon
Berlin Marathon